The 1930 Sewanee Tigers football team was an American football team that represented the Sewanee: The University of the South as a member of the Southern Conference during the 1930 college football season. In their first year under head coach Harvey Harman, the team compiled a 3–6–1 record.

Schedule

References

Sewanee
Sewanee Tigers football seasons
Sewanee Tigers football